The Tata Group is an Indian multinational conglomerate headquartered in Mumbai. Established in 1868, it is India's largest conglomerate, with products and services in over 150 countries, and operations in 100 countries across six continents. Acknowledged as the founder of the Tata Group, Jamsetji Tata is sometimes referred to as the "father of Indian industry".

Each Tata company operates independently under the guidance and supervision of its own board of directors and shareholders. Philanthropic trusts control over 66% of the Tata holding company Tata Sons, while the Tata family is a very small shareholder.

The group's annual revenue for fiscal year 2021–22 was reported to be US$128 billion. There are 29 publicly-listed Tata Group companies with a combined market capitalisation of $311 billion as of March 2022. The company has operations across Asia, Africa, America, and Middle East. Significant Tata Group affiliates include Tata Consultancy Services, Tata Consumer Products, Tata Motors, Tata Power, Tata Steel, Voltas, Titan Company, Tanishq, Tata Chemicals, Tata Communications, Trent, Tata Elxsi, Indian Hotels Company, Air India, TajAir, Tata Cliq, Tata Advanced Systems, Tata Capital, Cromā, BigBasket and Tata Starbucks.

History

1839–1904 

Jamshedji Nusserwanji Tata was born in 1839. Tata graduated from Elphinstone College in Bombay in 1858. Shortly afterwards, he joined his father’s trading firm that dealt in general merchandise. There, the junior Tata took a special interest in developing trade with China.

When the American Civil War caused a boom in the Bombay cotton market, Tata and his father joined the Asiatic Banking Corporation. When the tide ebbed, Tata's credit was left desolate. Fortunately, the firm’s credit was re-established during the next three years. A share in the lucrative contract for the commissariat of Napier’s expedition to Abyssinia in 1868 restored the family fortune.” In 1870 with Rs.21,000 capital, he founded a trading company. Further, he bought a bankrupt oil mill at Chinchpokli and converted it into a cotton mill, under the name Alexandra Mill which he sold for a profit after two years. In 1874, he set up another cotton mill at Nagpur named Empress Mill. He dreamed of achieving four goals, setting up an iron and steel company, a unique hotel, a world-class learning institution, and a hydroelectric plant. During his lifetime, in 1903, the Taj Mahal Hotel at Colaba waterfront was opened making it the first hotel with electricity in India.

1904–1938 
After Jamsedji's death, his older son Dorabji Tata became the chairman in 1904. Sir Dorabji established the Tata Iron and Steel company (TISCO), now known as Tata Steel in 1907. Marking the group's global ambitions, Tata Limited opened its first overseas office in London. Following the founder's goals, Western India's first hydro plant was brought to life, giving birth to Tata Power. Yet another dream, Indian Institute of Science was established with the first batch admitted in 1911.

1938–1991 

J. R. D. Tata was made chairman of the Tata Group in 1938. Under his chairmanship, the assets of the Tata Group grew from US$101 million to over US$5 billion. Starting with 14 enterprises, upon his departure half a century later in 1988, Tata Sons had grown to a conglomerate of 95 enterprises. These enterprises consisted of ventures that the company had either started or in which they held a controlling interest. New sectors such as chemicals, technology, cosmetics, marketing, engineering, manufacturing, tea, and software services earned them recognition.

In 1932, JRD founded an airline, known as Tata Air Services (later renamed Tata Airlines). In 1953, the Government of India passed the Air Corporations Act and purchased a majority stake in the carrier from Tata Sons, though JRD Tata would continue as chairman till 1977.

In 1945, Tata Motors was founded, first focused on locomotives. In 1954, it entered the commercial vehicle market after forming a joint venture with Daimler-Benz. In 1968, Tata Consultancy Services was founded.

1991–2012 

In 1991, Ratan Tata became chairman of Tata Group. This was also the year of economic liberalization in India, opening up the market to foreign competitors. During this time, Tata Group began to acquire several companies. Tata Group bought Tetley In February 2000. After that, it acquired Corus Group in 2007. In the year 2008, it acquired Jaguar and Land Rover. The company's subsidiary Tata Motors launched the Tata Nano which they presented as "the world’s most affordable car" in 2008.

In 2017, Natarajan Chandrasekaran was appointed chairman. He was instrumental in restructuring business verticals and increasing promoter stake ownership in companies. Under his leadership, the group made acquisitions through insolvency law and investments in E-commerce, expanded its airline business by winning a bid for Air India, and completely bought Air Asia India. He has mentioned the future strategy is to focus on healthcare, electronics, and digital.

Tata Owned Air India got approval to acquire AirAsia India, nearly two months after putting forth the proposal. The Competition Commission of India (CCI) approved the acquisition of the entire shareholding in Air Asia India by Tata-owned Air India.

Chairman
The chairman of Tata Sons is usually the chairman of the Tata Group. As of 2020, there have been seven chairmen of Tata Group.
 Jamsetji Tata (1868–1904)
 Sir Dorabji Tata (1904–1932)
 Nowroji Saklatwala (1932–1938)
 J. R. D. Tata (1938–1991)
 Ratan Tata (1991–2012)
 Cyrus Mistry (2012–2016)
 Ratan Tata (2016–2017)
 Natarajan Chandrasekaran (2017–present)

Affiliated companies

Acquisitions 
 February 2000 – Tetley Tea Company, $407 million
 March 2004 – Daewoo Commercial Vehicle Company, $102 million
 August 2004 – NatSteel's Steel business, $292 million
 November 2004 – Tyco Global Network, $130 million
 July 2005 – Teleglobe International Holdings, $239 million
 October 2005 – Good Earth Corporation
 December 2005 – Millennium Steel, Thailand, $165 million
 December 2005 – Brunner Mond Chemicals, $10 million
 June 2006 – Eight O'Clock Coffee, $220 million
 November 2006 – Ritz Carlton Boston, $170 million
 January 2007 – Corus Group, $12 billion
 March 2007 – PT Kaltim Prima Coal (KPC) (Bumi Resources), $1.1 billion
 April 2007 – Campton Place Hotel, San Francisco, $60 million
 January 2008 – Imacid Chemical Company, Morocco
 February 2008 – General Chemical Industrial Products, $1 billion
 March 2008 – Jaguar Cars and Land Rover, $2.3 billion
 March 2008 – Serviplem SA, Spain
 April 2008 – Comoplesa Lebrero SA, Spain
 May 2008 – Piaggio Aero Industries S.p.A., Italy - Sold Off in 2015
 June 2008 – China Enterprise Communications, China
 October 2008 – Miljo Grenland / Innovasjon, Norway
 April 2010 – Hewitt Robins International, United Kingdom
 July 2013 – Alti SA, France
 December 2014 – Energy Products Limited, India
 June 2016 – Welspun Renewables Energy, India
 May 2018 – Bhushan Steel Limited, India
 February 2021 - BigBasket (68%) by Tata Digital
 June 2021 - 1mg (55%) by Tata Digital
 January 2022 - Nilachala Ispat Nigam Ltd, $1.5 billion

Former companies 
 Tata Interactive Systems
 Tata Oil Mills Company and its subsidiary Lakmé Cosmetics

Philanthropy

Tata Group has helped establish and finance numerous research, educational and cultural institutes in India, and received the Carnegie Medal of Philanthropy. Some of the institutes established by the Tata Group are:
 Indian Institute of Science
 Tata Institute of Fundamental Research
 The Energy and Resources Institute (formerly known as Tata Energy and Research Institute), a non-governmental research institute
 The JRD Tata Ecotechnology Centre
 National Centre for Performing Arts
 Tata Center for Technology & Design at Massachusetts Institute of Technology
 Tata Centre for Technology & Design at IIT Bombay
 Tata Cricket Academy
 Tata IPL
 Tata Football Academy
 Tata Institute of Social Sciences
 Tata Management Training Centre
 Tata Medical Center, inaugurated on 16 May 2011 by Ratan Tata
 Tata Memorial Hospital
 Tata Cancer Hospital
 Tata Trusts, a group of philanthropic organizations run by the head of the business conglomerate Tata Sons

In 2008, Tata Group donated US$50 million to Cornell University for "agricultural and nutrition programs in India and for the education of Indian students at Cornell."

In 2010, Tata Group donated INR 2.20 billion (US$50 million) to Harvard Business School to build an academic and a residential building for executive education programmes on the institute's campus in Boston, Massachusetts. The building, now known as Tata Hall, is the largest endowment received by Harvard Business School from an international donor.

In 2017, Tata Trusts gifted US$70 million to University of California, San Diego and also partnered with it in setting up Tata Institute for Genetics and Society(TIGS) to address some of the world's most pressing issues, ranging from public health to agriculture. In recognition of the donation, the building which houses TIGS has been named Tata Hall. It is also the largest international donation made to University of California, San Diego.

In 2017, Tata Consultancy Services (TCS) donated an unprecedented US$35 million grant to Carnegie Mellon University, the largest ever industry donation to the university, to collaborate on promoting next-generation technologies that will drive the Fourth Industrial Revolution, including cognitive systems and autonomous vehicles.

In 2017, the Tata Football Academy won the bid to form the Jamshedpur FC, a football club based on Jamshedpur of Jharkhand in the 4th edition of the Indian Super League.

In 2020, Tata Group has donated INR 15 billion to PM Cares Fund to fight against COVID-19 pandemic in India.

Tata Trusts 
Most of the philanthropic activities of the group are carried out by various trusts incorporated by the members of the Tata family.

 Sir Dorabji Tata Trust and Allied Trusts
 Sir Dorabji Tata Trust
 Lady Tata Memorial Trust
 JRD Tata Trust
 Jamsetji Tata Trust
 Tata Social Welfare Trust
 JN Tata Endowment
 Tata Education Trust
 RD Tata Trust
 The JRD and Thelma J Tata Trust
 Sir Ratan Tata Trust & Allied Trusts
 Sir Ratan Tata Trust
 Tata Education and Development Trust
 Navajbai Ratan Tata Trust
 Bai Hirabai J. N. Tata Navsari Charitable Institution
 Sarvajanik Seva Trust

Criticism and controversies 
 
 
The Tata Group has also attracted some controversy during its more than 150 years in operation, notably:

Munnar, Kerala
The Chief Minister of Kerala V.S. Achuthanandan, who vowed to evict all on government land in Munnar, formed a special squad for the Munnar land takeover mission and started acquiring back properties. However, the mission was aborted due to both influential land-holders and opposition from Achuthanandan's own party.

Kalinganagar, Orissa
On 2 January 2006, Kalinganagar, Tribal Orissa villagers protested the construction of a new steel plant for Tata Steel on land historically owned by them. Some of the villagers had been evicted without adequate relocation. Police retribution was brutal: 37 protesters were injured and 13 killed, including 3 women and a 13-year-old boy. One policeman was hacked to death by a mob, after police had opened fire on protestors with tear gas and rubber bullets. Family members of the deceased villagers later claimed that the bodies had been mutilated during post-mortem examination.

Supplies to Burma's military regime
In December 2006, Myanmar's chief of general staff, General Thura Shwe Mann, visited the Tata Motors plant in Pune. In 2009, Tata Motors announced that it would manufacture trucks in Myanmar. Tata Motors reported that these contracts to supply hardware and automobiles to Burma's military were subsequently criticised by human rights activists.

Singur land acquisition 
The Singur controversy in West Bengal was a series of protests by locals and political parties over the forced acquisition, eviction, and inadequate compensation to those farmers displaced for the Tata Nano plant, during which Mamata Banerjee's party was widely criticised as acting for political gain. Despite the support of the Communist Party of India (Marxist) state government, Tata eventually pulled the project out of West Bengal, citing safety concerns. Narendra Modi, then Chief Minister of Gujarat, made land available for the Nano project.

On August 31, 2016, in a historic judgement, the Honorable Supreme Court of India set aside the land acquisition by the West Bengal Government in 2006 that had facilitated Tata Motors' Nano plant, stating that the West Bengal government had not taken possession of the land legally, and were now required to repossess and return it to local farmers within 12 weeks without compensation.

Dhamra Port, Firoz Krishna
The Port of Dhamara has received significant coverage, sparking controversy in India, and in Tata's emerging global markets. The Dhamra port, an equal joint venture between Tata Steel and Larsen & Toubro, has been criticised for its proximity to the Gahirmatha Sanctuary and Bhitarkanika National Park by Indian and international organisations, including Greenpeace; Gahirmatha Beach is one of the world's largest mass nesting sites for the olive ridley turtle, and India's second largest mangrove forest, Bhitarkanika, is a designated Ramsar site, and critics claimed that the port could disrupt mass nesting at Gahirmtha beaches as well as the ecology of the Bitharkanika mangrove forest.
Tata Steel employed mitigation measures set by the project's official advisor, the International Union for Conservation of Nature (IUCN), and the company pledging to "adopt all its recommendations without exception" when conservation organisations asserted that a thorough environmental impact analysis had not been done for the project, which had undergone changes in size and specifications since it was first proposed.

Proposed soda extraction plant in Tanzania
In 2007, Tata Group joined forces with a Tanzanian company to build a soda ash extraction plant in Tanzania. Environmental activists oppose the plant because it would be near Lake Natron, and it has a very high chance of affecting the lake's ecosystem and its neighbouring dwellers, jeopardising endangered lesser flamingo birds. Lake Natron is where two-thirds of lesser flamingos reproduce. Producing soda ash involves drawing out salt water from the lake, and then disposing the water back to the lake. This process could interrupt the chemical makeup of the lake. 22 African nations signed a petition to stop its construction.

Epic Systems trade-secret case judgement
In April 2016, a U.S. Federal Grand Jury awarded Epic Systems a US$940 million judgement against Tata Consultancy Services and Tata America International Corp. Filed 31 October 2014; the suit charged that "6,477 unauthorized downloads could be used to enhance Tata's competing product, Med Mantra." In 2017, U.S. District Court Judge William Conley reduced the Award to $420 million; the company states that the judgement is also being appealed, as "not supported by evidence presented during the trial and a strong appeal can be made to superior court to fully set aside the jury verdict.”

2018 NCLT verdict
In July 2018, the National Company Law Tribunal (NCLT), which "adjudicates issues relating to Indian companies," issued a verdict in the company's favor on charges of mismanagement leveled in 2016 by ousted chairman, Cyrus Mistry.

See also

 List of companies of India
 List of largest companies by revenue
 List of corporations by market capitalization
 Make in India
 Forbes Global 2000
 Fortune India 500
 Pallonji Mistry
 Noel Tata
 Sir Dorabji Tata and Allied Trusts

References

External links
 

 

 
Companies based in Mumbai 
Indian companies established in 1868
1868 establishments in India
Indian brands
Multinational companies headquartered in India
Manufacturing companies established in 1868 
Companies listed on the National Stock Exchange of India 
Companies listed on the Bombay Stock Exchange